The Central Philippine University College of Theology, also referred to as the CPU COT, CPU College of Theology or CPU Theology, is the theological seminary and one of the academic units of Central Philippine University, a private university in Iloilo City, Philippines. Founded in 1905 as the Bible School for the training of men Christian workers and missionaries through a grant of the American industrialist and Northern Baptist, John D. Rockefeller, it is the oldest college and academic unit of Central Philippine University and the first and oldest Baptist theological seminary in the Philippines.

It was later folded and became as the theological department, a year after when Jaro Industrial School (the second predecessor of Central Philippine University), became a junior college in 1923. In 1938, the Baptist Missionary Training School for women, a separate seminary for women, merged with it when Central Philippine University became a senior college. In 1953 when Central Philippine College became a university, the department became as the College of Theology.

The seminary at present maintains sisterhood ties with Silliman University Divinity School as both were founded by Protestant American missionaries, affiliated with the Convention of Philippine Baptist Churches and is accredited with the Association of Theological Education in South East Asia (ATESEA).

History

Prior when the Philippines was ceded to the United States administration by Spain through the Treaty of Paris (1898), the Americans brought their faith, the Protestantism. A comity agreement with Protestant American churches and sects was created to divide the Philippine islands for missionary works and to avoid future conflicts with different churches. Western Visayas came to the jurisdictions of the Baptists (Northern Baptist).

An idea of establishing an industrial for boys and theological seminary to train Christian workers and ministers thereafter was conceived. Then in 1901, a grant was given by the American industrialist], philanthropist, oil magnate, and devoted Northern Baptist John D. Rockefeller to establish mission schools in the islands to the American Baptist Churches. The Philippine Baptist Conference voted later in December 1904 to establish two schools, an industrial school for boys and a Bible school to train ministers and other Christian workers. The task to found the mission schools was given to American missionary William Orison Valentine, who also became the first presidents of the both schools, with other missionaries as co-founders. Before it, Valentine and Miss Van Allen were married back in 1903 and thereafter, the couple left for the new appointment in Iloilo in the Philippines.

In the summer of 1905 (June), the Baptist Missionary Training School was established by the Reverend William Orison Valentine in their home and later in the fall of 1905, the Jaro Industrial School was established. The leadership of the Bible School was turned over to the Reverend Henry Munger who conducted classes off campus. In 1907, Dr. Eric Lund became principal and classes were held at the Mission Press building where Lund was doing his Scripture translation work. When Dr. Lund left in 1912, the Bible School was closed. It was reopened in 1913 by Reverend Alton Bigelow. It was under his leadership that the school began to have a definite direction in its development.

In 1923, the Jaro Industrial School became Central Philippine College. In April of the following year, the Baptist Missionary Training School became an organic part of the college. A program leading to the degree of Bachelor of Theology was offered. Those who enrolled were men students who were trained to be pastors of the churches. In 1936, through the guidance of Rev. Alton Bigelow, the school became the Department of Theology of Central Philippine College.

While the Baptist Missionary Training School was established for the training of men to be pastors, the training of women to be missionaries began in 1907 with the establishment of separate seminary for women under the leadership of Miss Anna V. Johnson and Celia Sainz. Both were sent to the Philippines by the Women's American Baptist Foreign Mission Society. Miss Johnson was assigned in Capiz. The seminary for women continued to develop separately from the Baptist Missionary Training School until 1938, when it was merged with the Department of Theology of Central Philippine College. With the merging of the two schools, two degree programs were offered-the Bachelor of Theology and the Bachelor of Science in Religious Education. On April 1, 1953, Central Philippine College was granted government recognition as a university. Following this, the Department of Theology became the College of Theology. Gradually, the leadership of the university and the College of Theology was turned over to the Filipinos. A significant part of this Filipinization process took place in 1966 when Dr. Rex D. Drilon became the first Filipino President of the university.

At present, the college is affiliated with the Convention of Philippine Baptist Churches and a member of Association of Theological Education in South East Asia and the South East Asia Graduate School of Theology. It also maintains fraternal ties with American Baptist Churches, the Australian Baptist Mission Society, the Baptist World Alliance, the Asian Baptist Fellowship, the National Council of Churches in the Philippines and other Christian organizations.

Academic programs

The college has two departments: Religion and Ethics and Music. As a Protestant seminary, the college is affiliated with the Convention of Philippine Baptist Churches and provided various undergraduate and graduate degrees which are accredited with the Association for Theological Education in South East Asia. The college offers graduate programs through the Central Philippine University School of Graduate Studies.

Footnotes

External links
cpu.edu.ph/college-of-theology (Official website of CPU College of Theology)
facebook.com/College-of-Theology-Student-Council-2020-2021-101756058327933/ (CPU College of Theology Provincial Council Official Facebook page)
cpu.edu.ph (Official website of Central Philippine University)

Central Philippine University
Seminaries and theological colleges in the Philippines
History of the Philippines (1898–1946)
Universities and colleges in Iloilo City
Baptist seminaries and theological colleges